Kevin James Sorrell (born 6 March 1977, in Harold Wood) was a rugby union player who played as a centre for Saracens and is now on the coaching staff as backs coach.

Sorrell was selected for the senior England squad for the 2002 tour of Argentina.

After announcing his retirement after the 09/10 season, he took up an offer to coach Saracens academy with Mosese Rauluni. He is now the backs coach for the senior squad.

In 2019 Sorrell launched his own tank top leisurewear brand #superKS. He is currently in training for the 2023 world logging championships in Finland and has recently gone into partnership brewing craft beers with Craig Gamble.

He was Essex schools backgammon champion for 5 consecutive years from 1990-1995, and represented England in the short form format at the Indian World championships in 1991, finishing with a bronze medal.

References

External links
 England profile
 Saracens Profile
 scrum.com statistics
 Guinness Premiership profile

1977 births
Living people
English rugby union players
People from Harold Wood
Saracens F.C. players
Rugby union players from Essex
Rugby union centres